Paasche is a surname. Notable people with the surname include:

 Eystein Paasche (born 1932), Norwegian botanist
 Fredrik Paasche (1886–1943), Norwegian educator and author
 Hans Paasche (1881–1920), German politician, pacifist, ethnologist, and writer; son of Hermann
 Hermann Paasche (1851–1925), German statistician and economist
 Johan Henrik Paasche Thorne (1843–1920), Norwegian businessperson and politician
 Øystein Paasche (born 1963), Norwegian musician and drummer

See also 
 Paasche Airbrush Company, Chicago, USA
 Paasche index
 Paasche's index
 Pasche
 Paasch
 Pasch (surname)

Norwegian-language surnames
German-language surnames